The eighth season of Australian reality television series The Block, titled The Block: Fans v Faves, premiered on Monday, 27 January 2014 at 7:00 pm on the Nine Network. Scott Cam (host) and Shelley Craft (Challenge Master) returned from the previous season, as did the three judges: Neale Whitaker, Shaynna Blaze and Darren Palmer. Production for the series in Melbourne, which was the location for the previous season, in the suburb of 
Albert Park. Steve & Chantelle were the eventual winners of The Block with a $636,000 profit on a sale price of $2,470,000 plus an additional $100,000 bonus for winning The Block.

Contestants
This season introduces 2 new couples (dubbed "Fans") and 2 returning couples (dubbed "Favourites"/"Faves"). The couples selected were as follows:

Notes

Score history

Results

Room Reveals

Judges' Scores

  The prize for this week was $10,000 cash, towards the couple's winnings. They were told to redo the room that the judges disliked the most:-
 Chantelle and Steve - Guest Bedroom 1
 Kyal and Kara - Drying Terrace
 Alisa and Lysandra - Main Bathroom
 Brad and Dale - Kitchen
  The prize for reveal 2 was to receive money off their reserves. There were two teams:
• Brad & Dale + Kyal & Kara (House 2)• Alisa & Lysandra + Chantelle & Steve (House 1)The teams split the money they won as a team

Auction

Ratings

Ratings data is from OzTAM and represents the live and same day average viewership from the 5 largest Australian metropolitan centres (Sydney, Melbourne, Brisbane, Perth and Adelaide).

References

2014 Australian television seasons
8